Television Themes is the seventh studio album by English comedian and musician Matt Berry, released in October 2018 by Acid Jazz Records. The album includes Berry's reworked versions of television theme tunes from the 1960s to the 1980s. It reached number 38 in the UK Albums Chart.

Track listing

References

2018 albums
Matt Berry albums
Acid Jazz Records albums